Antonie din Popeşti (? – after 1672) was ruler of Wallachia from March 1669 to 1672.

Antonie din Popeşti, a member of a boyar family, came to power with the assistance of the Cantacuzino family, who had supported Radu Leon, the previous ruler, until he turned against them in late 1668. The Cantacuzino's support for Antonie din Popeşti formed part of their struggle with the Ghica family.

He was deposed in March 1672 on the orders of Köprülü Fazıl Ahmed, Grand Vizier of the Ottoman Empire, who was persuaded to restore the former ruler and Ghica family candidate, Grigore I Ghica.

Rulers of Wallachia
17th-century monarchs in Europe